Kheyrabad (also Romanized as Kheyrābād) is a village in Golmakan Rural District, Golbajar District, Chenaran County, Razavi Khorasan Province, Iran. At the 2006 census, its population was 224, in 63 families.

References 

Populated places in Chenaran County